Fred Valentine may refer to:

Fred Valentine (footballer, born 1880) (1880–19??), English footballer
Fred Valentine (footballer, born 1909) (1909–1981), English footballer 
Fred Valentine (baseball) (1935–2022), American baseball player

See also
 Fred (name)
 Valentine (name)